The discography of Deen, a Japanese J-pop band, consists of nineteen studio albums and forty-six singles.

Studio albums

Live albums

Compilation albums

B-Side albums

Cover albums

EPs

Singles

Video albums DVD

Video Albums Blu-Ray

Music Video

References

Discographies of Japanese artists
Pop music group discographies